The acronym MATS may refer to:

 Marc-André ter Stegen, a German footballer
 Measurements with Advanced Trapping Systems, an Helmholtz research group for young investigators
 Mercury and Air Toxics Standards, as set by the U.S. Environmental Protection Agency
 Metropolitan Adelaide Transport Study, an abandoned transport scheme for the city of Adelaide
 Military Air Transport Service, a defunct command of the United States Air Force
 Montgomery Area Transit System, the public transportation in Montgomery, Alabama
 Mainz-Tele-Surgery, the pediatric surgical telemedical service of the University Medical Center Mainz, Germany
 Mesospheric Airglow/Aerosol Tomography and Spectroscopy, a Swedish satellite project in atmospheric physics

See also
 Mat (disambiguation)
 Mads (disambiguation)